OHMphrey is the self-titled first studio album by the instrumental rock band OHMphrey. It was released on May 19, 2009 on Magna Carta Records.

Track listing

Personnel
Chris Poland – guitar, mixing
Jake Cinninger – guitar
Joel Cummins – keyboard
Kris Myers – drums
Robertino Pagliari – bass
Peter Sardelich – engineering
Randy Pevler – mixing
Jim Brick – mastering

References

2009 debut albums
Magna Carta Records albums